Jacques Christaud-Pipola (born 13 August 1948) is a French bobsledder. He competed at the 1968 Winter Olympics and the 1972 Winter Olympics.

References

1948 births
Living people
French male bobsledders
Olympic bobsledders of France
Bobsledders at the 1968 Winter Olympics
Bobsledders at the 1972 Winter Olympics
People from Voiron
Sportspeople from Isère